Bernhard Wicki (28 October 1919 – 5 January 2000) was an Austrian actor and film director.

Life and career 
Wicki studied in the city of Breslau such topics as art history, history and German literature. In 1938, he transferred to the drama school of the Staatliches Schauspielhaus in Berlin. In 1939, because of his membership in the Bündische Jugend, he was imprisoned for many months in the Sachsenhausen concentration camp. After his release, he moved to Vienna, then in 1944 to Switzerland.

After World War II, he starred in many films, including Die letzte Brücke (1953) and Es geschah am 20. Juli (1955). He was also a photographer. His first attempt at directing came three years later with the documentary Warum sind sie gegen uns? (1958). He became internationally famous with his 1959 anti-war film Die Brücke, which was nominated for the Academy Award for Best Foreign Language Film. In 1961 he won the Silver Bear for Best Director at the 11th Berlin International Film Festival for his film The Miracle of Father Malachia. His break in Hollywood came shortly thereafter when he was chosen to direct Marlon Brando and Yul Brynner in the highly acclaimed World War II espionage thriller, Morituri in 1965.

Wicki was a patron of the International Film Festival in Emden-Norderney, which first started in 1990.

Wicki first married Agnes Fink, a fellow acting colleague, and later married Elisabeth Endriss, also a colleague. In the documentary Verstörung – und eine Art von Poesie (June 2007), Elisabeth Wicki-Endriss portrayed Wicki's life and work.

Wicki is buried at the Nymphenburger cemetery in Munich (grave number 4-1-23).

In 2001, the Bernhard Wicki Memorial Fund was established in Munich. Since 2002, it has awarded a yearly prize, The Bridge, to selected films that promote peace. A further prize of 15,000 euros, endowed in 2006, is presented in his name in the city of Emden.

Selected filmography
Director
 Warum sind sie gegen uns? (1958)
 Die Brücke (1959)
 The Miracle of Father Malachia (1961)
 The Longest Day (with Ken Annakin and Andrew Marton) (1962)
 The Visit (1964)
 Morituri (1965)
  (1971)
 Karpfs Karriere (1971)
 The Conquest of the Citadel (1977)
  (1984)
 Sansibar oder Der letzte Grund (1987)
 Spider's Web (1989)

Actor

 Der Postmeister (1940) – Statist (uncredited)
 The Falling Star (1950) – Otto
 Young Heart Full of Love (1953) – Vitus Zingerl
 The Last Bridge (1954) – Boro
 Circus of Love (1954) – Franz
 Prisoners of Love (1954) – Franz Martens
 The Mosquito (1954) – Hugo
 A Double Life (1954) – Rainer von Hohenburg
 The Eternal Waltz (1954) – Johann Strauß Sohn
 Children, Mother, and the General (1955) – Hauptmann Dornberg
 Jackboot Mutiny (1955) – Oberst Graf v. Stauffenberg
 Du mein stilles Tal (1955) – Erik Linden
 Roses in Autumn (1955) – Geert von Innstetten
 Fruit Without Love (1956) – Dr. Kolb
 Weil du arm bist, mußt du früher sterben (1956) – Dr. Grüter
  (1956) – Dr. Jan Vlimmen
 Queen Louise (1957) – Zar Alexander
  (1957) – Robert
 The Zurich Engagement (1957) – Paul Frank
 Es wird alles wieder gut (1957) – Unterhaltungschef Dr. Johann Krapp
 Escape from Sahara (1958) – Luigi Locatelli
 The Cat (1958) – Bernard Werner
 Restless Night (1958) – Priest Brunner
 Frauensee (1958) – Karl Anton Graf Chur
  (1959) – Tex Richards
 Stage Fright (1960) – Rohrbach
 La Notte (1961) – Tommaso Garani
 L'amore difficile (1962) – Hans (segment "Il serpente")
 Eleven Years and One Day (1963) – Karl Rodenbach
 Portuguese Vacation (1963) – Bernard
  (1969) – Vaeter / Father
 Carlos (1971, TV Movie) – Philipp
 Crime and Passion (1976) – Rolf
 Derrick (1977, Season 4, Episode 3: "Eine Nacht im Oktober") – Dr. Lechner
 The Glass Cell (1978) – Police Commissioner Österreicher
 Despair (1978) – Orlovius
 The Left-Handed Woman (1978) – Verleger
 The Man in the Rushes (1978) – Sir Gerald
 Death Watch (1980) – Katherine's Dad
 Derrick (1980, Season 7, Episode 9: "Zeuge Yuroski") – Karl Yurowski
  (1982) – Lehrter
 The Mysterious Stranger (1982, TV Movie) – Heinrich Stein
 Spring Symphony (1983) – Baron von Fricken
 A Love in Germany (1983) – Dr. Borg
 Dangerous Moves (1984) – Pühl
 Paris, Texas (1984) – Doctor Ulmer
 Bereg (1984) – Weber, Verleger
 A Kind of Anger (1984, TV Movie) – Philipp Sanger
  (1985) – George Abbot
  (1986) – Von der Mühle
 Spider's Web (1989) – Herr Waizenbaum
 The Betrothed (1989, TV Miniseries) – Gentleman's Father 
 Martha and I (1990) – Narrator (scenes deleted)
 Success (1991) – Bichler
 Das Geheimnis (1993) – Dr. Virgil Schwarz
 Prinzenbad (1993) – Dany

Decorations and awards
 1958: Film Award in Silver (documentary) for Warum sind sie gegen uns? (Why they are against us?)
 1960: The Golden Bowl, Film Award (Director), German Film Critics Award, German Youth Film Award, Golden Globe and an Academy Award nomination (Best Foreign Film) for Die Brücke (The Bridge)
 1960: United Nations award for contribution to peace
 1961: Silver Bear at the Berlin Film Festival (Best Director) for The Miracle of Father Malachia
 1962: Bambi
 1972: Golden Camera (Director) and Film Award (Director) for Das falsche Gewicht (The wrong weight)
 1976: Film Award for many years of excellent work in the German film industry
 1977: Film Award in Silver for The Conquest of the Citadel
 1979: St. Jakob Prandtauer Prize for Science and Art of the city of St Pölten
 1982: Great Cross of Merit of the Federal Republic of Germany
 1985: Film Award (Director) for Die Grünstein-Variante (The greenstone variant)
 1986: Helmut Käutner Award
 1986: Critics Award for Die Grünstein-Variante
 1988: Adolf Grimme Award for Sansibar oder Der letzte Grund (Zanzibar or The last Reason)
 1989: Film Award (Special Film Award 40 years Federal Republic of Germany) for Die Brücke
 1989: Bavarian Film Award
 1989: Honorary Award of the Abendzeitung (Evening Paper)
 1989: Academy Award nomination (Best Foreign Film) and Film Award (Director) for The Spider's Web
 1990: Berlin International Film Festival: Berlinale Camera
 1990: Schwabing Art Prize (prize)
 1992: Universum Film AG prize
 1992: Bavarian Order of Merit
 1998: DIVA Award
 1999: Medal "Munich shines" in gold
 2000: Austrian Cross of Honour for Science and Art, 1st class

References

Further reading 
 Peter Zander: Bernhard Wicki. Bertz + Fischer Verlag, Berlin 1995, 2. überarbeitete Auflage, 
 Richard Blank: Jenseits der Brücke. Bernhard Wicki. Ein Leben für den Film, 1999 
 Andreas Weber (ed.): Er kann fliegen lassen. Gespräche und Texte über Bernhard Wicki. Literaturedition Niederösterreich, St. Pölten 2000, 
 Filmfestival Nordrhein-Westfalen (Hrsg.): Sanftmut und Gewalt – Der Regisseur und Schauspieler Bernhard Wicki. Filmographie, Biographie, Essays, Interview. Mit Beiträgen von Robert Fischer (Vorwort), Alexander Kluge, Laurens Straub, Wilhelm Roth, Friedrich Dürrenmatt, Hans Abich, Gunther Witte, Hermann Barth. edition filmwerkstatt, Essen 2004, 
 Inka Graeve Ingelmann (Hrsg.): Bernhard Wicki. Fotografien. Dumont Literatur und Kunst Verlag, Köln 2005, Gebunden, Ausstellungskatalog
 Elisabeth Endriss-Wicki: Die Filmlegende Bernhard Wicki. Verstörung – und eine Art von Poesie. Henschel Verlag, Berlin 2007, 
 Michel Quint, "Die schrecklichen Gärten". btb-Verlag 2002,  (Übersetzung von Elisabeth Edl), Original edition: "Effroyables Jardins", Editions Joelle Losfeld, Paris 2000

External links

Photographs and literature

1919 births
2000 deaths
People from Sankt Pölten
Austrian film directors
Austrian male film actors
Austrian male television actors
German-language film directors
Silver Bear for Best Director recipients
Commanders Crosses of the Order of Merit of the Federal Republic of Germany
Recipients of the Austrian Cross of Honour for Science and Art, 1st class
20th-century Austrian male actors
Best Director German Film Award winners